Trilogy was an American freestyle and hip hop group from The Bronx, New York City, founded in 1985 by Carlos "CNR" Rivera, Duran Ramos and J.R. Mansanet. The group pioneered freestyle music and scored several hit songs including "Love Me Forever Or Love Me Not", "Good Time", and "Do You Wanna Get Funky".

History
Trilogy was formed by Duran Ramos (born Randy Duran Ramos), J.R. Mansanet (born Hector Mansanet), and Ceanar Rivera (born Carlos Rivera) in New York City. The group was briefly on the Jackie Jack Records roster and managed by George Vascones. In 1985, they released their debut single "Red Hot", a freestyle radio hit. In 1987, they released another freestyle single "Latin Love". In 1988, they released another single "Gotta Be Free". In 1990, Trilogy were introduced to Robert Clivillés and David Cole. During that time, Clivillés offered the group a chance to record the future greatly successful song "Gonna Make You Sweat (Everybody Dance Now)", but they declined. Despite declining to record the song, Ramos contributed background vocals on the C+C Music Factory's album Gonna Make You Sweat. In 1991, Trilogy released a single "Love Me Forever Or Love Me Not", produced by Clivillés and Cole. The single peaked at number 82 on the Billboard'''s Hot 100, 

In early 1992, Rivera left the group and was replaced with Angel DeLeon. Several months later, Mansanet left the group and was replaced by Kenny Diaz. Diaz departed from the group and was replaced by Darrin Henson. In late 1992, Trilogy (Ramos, DeLeon, and Henson) released a single called "Good Time". In 1994, Henson departed from the group after disagreeing with the C+C Music Factory production contract and was replaced with singer Joey Kid.Trilogy, Discogs In the same year, the new lineup of Trilogy debuted as the main male vocalists on the C+C Music Factory album Anything Goes!. The group were featured on the successful singles "Do You Wanna Get Funky" and "Take a Toke". Following the release of the album, Trilogy toured with C+C Music Factory in 1995.

After the C+C Music Factory tour, Trilogy disbanded in June 1995. Ramos continued to work and produce music with Clivillés and Cole as well as produce music for other singers including Busta Rhymes, Lisa Lisa & Cult Jam, and New Kids on the Block.C+C Music Factory's David Cole Succumbs, Jet, 13 February 1995 (page 18) Rivera pursued a solo career and often performed under the stage name CNR of Trilogy. Mansanet left the music industry and pursued a career as a video engineer for several major telecommunication companies in New York and South Florida. Joey Kid continued on as a solo artist. Angel DeLeon pursued a career as a tv host starting in 1998. In 1999, Angel DeLeon became one of the hosts for the Montreux Jazz Festival.

In 2007, the original members (Ramos, Rivera, and Mansanet) reunited for the first time in 15 years for a one-time performance at Mohegan Sun Arena in Uncasville, Connecticut. On November 8, 2014, Ramos and Rivera received an honorary award on behalf of Trilogy at the Freestyle Honor Awards in Kissimmee, Florida for their musical contributions to freestyle music. They also performed their song "Latin Love". In the same year, Rivera began performing under the "Trilogy" name with two additional vocalists. In March 2017, Ramos and DeLeon reunited as Trilogy and began performing at different venues. In 2018, DeLeon launched an online talk show series called "Angel In The City". In 2019, Rivera (under the "Trilogy" name; with two other vocalists) toured with other freestyle music artists on the "I Love Freestyle Music Tour". The tour also included Kid, who performed separate from Trilogy.

In 2021, Rivera announced that Trilogy had reunited. Trilogy (Rivera, Ramos, Mansanet, and DeLeon) released a single "Sound of Thunder" on Londinium The Label. In 2022, all seven members of Trilogy were interviewed by director Maria Soccor for the upcoming documentary Freestyle Music: The Legacy'', which is currently still in production.

On July 28th, 2022, Carlos "CNR" Rivera passed away. Many members of Trilogy posted tributes to him on social media, and on August 5th the documentary's social media accounts shared unreleased pictures of Rivera from the set of the upcoming film.

Discography

Singles

References

External links
 Trilogy Facebook page
 Trilogy Myspace page 

American dance music groups
American freestyle music groups
American musical trios
American pop music groups
American singers of Dominican Republic descent
Electronic music groups from New York (state)
Freestyle musicians
Latin music songwriters
Latin pop singers
Musical groups disestablished in 1995
Musical groups established in 1985
Musical groups from New York City
Pop-rap groups
Spanish dance musicians
Teen pop groups
Vocal trios
C+C Music Factory members